Konrád Nagy (born 26 March 1992, in Debrecen) is a Hungarian speed skater and former short track speed skater. He started in short track speed skating, but switched to "long-track" in 2013. He competed in speed skating for Hungary at the 2014 Winter Olympics.

Nagy is the current holder of the Hungarian records in 1000, 1500, 3000, 5000 and 10000 metres.

Personal records

References

External links
 

1992 births
Living people
Hungarian male speed skaters
Hungarian male short track speed skaters
Olympic speed skaters of Hungary
Speed skaters at the 2014 Winter Olympics
Speed skaters at the 2018 Winter Olympics
Sportspeople from Debrecen